Matchbox are an English rockabilly band that formed in 1971, and is still active .

Career
Matchbox were formed in Middlesex, in 1971 by Iain "Houndog" Terry (born 1950), Fred Poke (born 1948), Jimmy Redhead (born 1954) and Wiffle Smith (born 1948). After 1978, the line-up consisted of Graham Fenton (lead vocalist), Steve Bloomfield (lead guitar, vocals), Gordon Scott (rhythm guitar), Fred Poke (bass guitar) and Jimmy Redhead (drums). Redhead left in 1973, Smith in 1977 and Lupton in 1978 to tour with Chuck Berry. Dick Callan joined Matchbox on guitar, saxophone and violin until approximately 1985, writing many of the band's B-sides. The band appeared in the 1980 film Blue Suede Shoes which detailed the revival of 1950s rock 'n' roll music scene at the time.

The band's biggest hits include "Rockabilly Rebel" (Bloomfield, 1979), "Midnite Dynamos" (Bloomfield, 1980), a cover of The Crickets' "When You Ask About Love" (their only top five hit), and "Over the Rainbow" (adapted musical song, 1980). In Australia, the band and album were dubbed 'Major Matchbox' to prevent confusion with an Australian band of a similar name. Their last single, "I Want Out" (Brian Hodgson/Ray Peters/Tony Colton, 1983) from their album, Crossed Line, was produced together with Kirsty MacColl.

In 1989, Graham Fenton put together a band with Iain Terry, Bob Burgos, Howard Gadd and Greg Gadd. They called themselves Graham Fenton's Matchbox. They recorded six albums in the early 1990s. The most popular Matchbox line-up reformed in 1995. The band have been playing live all over Europe since their comeback, especially in Germany, France, the Netherlands, Spain, Finland and Sweden. On occasions, Iain Terry and Dave Dix were used as replacements for Bloomfield and Poke.

They have recorded one album since their full 1995 reunion.

Band members
 Line-up 1971–1975: Wiffle Smith, Iain "Houndog" Terry, Fred Poke and Jimmy Redhead
 Line-up 1976–1977: Wiffle Smith, Steve Bloomfield, Fred Poke, Rusty Lupton and Wild Bob Burgos
 Line-up 1977–1978: Steve Bloomfield, Fred Poke, Bob Burgos, Rusty Lupton and Graham Fenton
 Line-up 1978–1980: Steve Bloomfield, Fred Poke, Graham Fenton, Gordon Scott and Jimmy Redhead
 Line-up 1980–1981: Steve Bloomfield, Fred Poke, Graham Fenton, Gordon Scott, Jimmy Redhead and Dick Callan
 Line-up 1982–1985: Graham Fenton, Dick Callan, Jimmy Redhead, Gordon Scott and Brian Hodgson
 Line-up 1985–198?: Graham Fenton, Dick Callan, Jimmy Redhead, Brian Hodgson and Gerry Hogan
 Line-up 1995–    : Graham Fenton, Steve Bloomfield, Jimmy Redhead, Gordon Scott and Fred Poke

Discography

References

External links

Another Biography with photos

English rock music groups
Musical groups established in 1971
Rockabilly music groups
Magnet Records artists